In Roman mythology, Morta was the goddess of death. She was believed to preside over infants who died.

Aulus Gellius understood her name to be the similar as Morea. Morta’s name most likely mean fate.

References

Parcae
Death goddesses
Roman goddesses
Time and fate goddesses
Textiles in folklore